The Kansas City Terminal Railway  is a Class III terminal railroad that serves as a joint operation of the trunk railroads that serve the Kansas City metropolitan area, the United States' second largest rail hub after Chicago. It is operated by the Kaw River Railroad.

The railway was created after a series of floods in 1903, 1904, and 1908 inundated the West Bottoms each time and temporarily closed the Union Depot there.  The 12 original trunk railways of the city at the time joined to build the new Kansas City Union Station and to coordinate the bridges and switches that serve the city.

Under an Interstate Commerce Commission order, the railway operated and then oversaw the liquidation of the Rock Island Line from 1979 to 1980.

The railway owns and dispatches 85 miles of track (25 in Kansas and 60 in Missouri) and leases six locomotives and no freight cars.  It no longer owns Union Station.  It has subcontracted its maintenance operations to BNSF.

The original trunk railroads that were owners of the Kansas City Terminal were: 
 Alton Railroad
 Atchison, Topeka & Santa Fe Railway
 Chicago, Burlington & Quincy Railroad
 Chicago Great Western Railway
 Chicago, Milwaukee, St. Paul & Pacific Railroad
 Chicago, Rock Island & Pacific Railroad
 Kansas City Southern Railway
 Missouri-Kansas-Texas Railroad
 Missouri Pacific Railroad
 St. Louis-San Francisco Railway
 Union Pacific Railroad
 Wabash Railroad

It now serves the Class I railroads BNSF, Canadian Pacific Railway, Kansas City Southern, Norfolk Southern Railway and Union Pacific as well as the Class III railroads Missouri & Northern Arkansas Railroad and Genesee & Wyoming, plus Amtrak.

References

1906 establishments in Missouri
Chicago, Rock Island and Pacific Railroad
Companies based in Kansas City, Missouri
Kansas City Southern Railway
Kansas railroads
Missouri railroads
Non-operating common carrier freight railroads in the United States
Railway companies established in 1906
Switching and terminal railroads